Year 885 (DCCCLXXXV) was a common year starting on Friday (link will display the full calendar) of the Julian calendar.

Events 
 By place 
 Europe 
 Summer – Emperor Charles the Fat summons a meeting of officials at Lobith (modern Netherlands), and accuses Hugh, an illegitimate son of former king Lothair II, and his vassal Godfrid, Duke of Frisia, of plotting against him. Hugh is blinded, and exiled to the Abbey of Saint Gall (modern Switzerland). Godfrid is killed by a group of Frisian and Saxon nobles, at the connivance of Henry of Franconia. The local count, Gerolf, takes over the West Frisian coastline from the Danish, after the murder.
 Summer – Charles the Fat designates his illegitimate son Bernard as his heir, ignoring the claims of his nephew, Arnulf of Carinthia (illegitimate son of Carloman of Bavaria), and Charles the Simple (5-year-old son of King Louis the Stammerer). The Frankish bishops protest, so Charles summons Pope Adrian III to an assembly in Worms, to resolve the issue. Adrian leaves Rome in the hands of Bishop John of Pavia and heads to Germany, but dies on the way, just after crossing the River Po.
 November 25 – Siege of Paris: Viking forces, under the Norse chieftains Sigfred and Sinric, sail up the River Seine for eastern France, with a fleet of 300 longships (10,000 men). They appear before Paris, and offer to spare the city if they are allowed free passage, by paying them tribute (Danegeld). Their request is denied.
 November 27 – The Vikings begin the Siege of Paris (885–886) by attacking the northeast tower with ballistae, mangonels and catapults. All Viking attacks are repulsed by Odo, Count of Paris, who defends the city with a small garrison (about 200 men). Sigfred decides to withdraw, and builds a camp on the right bank of the river. Meanwhile he mines the city, and scours the countryside for provisions.

 Britain 
 King Alfred the Great summons Asser, a relative of Bishop Nobis of St. David's, to the English court. He agrees to spend six months of the year in the king's service. Asser helps to negotiate the recognition of Alfred, as overlord of the Welsh kings. 
 Danish Vikings land in Kent and besiege Rochester. Town defences having been improved, the city holds out long enough for Alfred the Great to organize an army. He forces the Vikings to flee back across the Channel, to the Continent.
 Kings Hyfaidd of Dyfed, Elisedd of Brycheiniog and Hywel of Glywysing, being harassed by the armies of King Anarawd in Wales, seek the protection of Alfred the Great, and submit to his overlordship. Anarawd seeks an alliance with King Guthred of York.

 Arabian Empire 
 Battle of Tawahin: Muslim forces (4,000 men) of the Abbasid Caliphate, under Al-Mu'tadid, are defeated near Ramlah (modern Israel) by Khumarawayh, ruler of the Tulunid dynasty. This ends the Abbasid attempt to recover Syria from the Tulunids. A large part of the Abbasid army is captured, and transported to Egypt. Khumarawayh aims for reconciliation with the caliphal government, and allows the soldiers who want to return to modern-day Iraq to depart without ransom, while offering the rest the opportunity to settle in Egypt.

 By topic 
 Religion 
 July 8 – Pope Adrian III dies after a 1½ reign near Modena (Lombardy), while en route to an Imperial Diet, summoned by Charles the Fat at Worms. He is succeeded by Stephen V, as the 110th pope of the Catholic Church.

Births 
 February 6 – Daigo, emperor of Japan (d. 930)
 February 11 – Li Congke, emperor of Later Tang (d. 937)
 December 2 – Zhuang Zong, emperor of Later Tang (d. 926)
 Atto of Vercelli, Lombard bishop (d. 961)
 Eberhard III, duke of Franconia (d. 939)
 Eric Bloodaxe, Norwegian Viking ruler (d. 954)
 Fujiwara no Onshi, empress of Japan (d. 954)
 Gao Xingzhou, Chinese general (d. 952)
 Ibn Muqla, Muslim official and vizier (or 886)
 Reccared, Galician clergyman (d. 923)
 Zhao Ying, Chinese chancellor (d. 951)

Deaths 
 April 6 – Methodius, Byzantine missionary and bishop (b. 815)
 June – Godfrid, Duke of Frisia, 'the Sea King', murdered
 July 8 – Adrian III, pope of the Catholic Church
 July 25 – Ragenold, margrave of Neustria, killed
 July/August – Sulayman ibn Wahb, Muslim official and vizier
 November 17 – Liutgard of Saxony, Frankish queen
 Chen Ru, Chinese warlord and governor, killed
 Gerebald, bishop of Chalon-sur-Saône
 Mihira Bhoja, king of the Gurjara-Pratihara dynasty (b. 836)
 Muiredach mac Brain, king of Leinster (Ireland)
 Zhu Jingmei, Chinese eunuch and military leader, assassinated

References